Aldridge is an industrial town in the Walsall borough, West Midlands, England. It is historically a village that was part of Staffordshire until 1974. The town is also the second-largest town in the Walsall Borough (By population after Walsall).

History 

The name "Aldridge" is derived from the Anglo-Saxon alr or alre + wīc meaning 'alder (tree) + village'. Another suggestion is that the name "Aldridge" means "outlying farm among alder-trees", from the Old English alor and wīc. It was recorded as Alrewic in the Domesday Book of 1086 when it was valued at 15 shillings and had a population of seven households; the Lord was Robert (d'Oilly) and the tenant-in-chief was William son of Ansculf. The name was recorded as Alrewich and Allerwych in the 12th century.

Aldridge began as a small agricultural settlement, with farming being the most common occupation up until the 19th century.

In the 1800s, Aldridge became an industrial town with coal mines and lime kilns. The coal and clay in the area prompted many to set up collieries and brickworks. Aldridge clay is especially useful in the manufacture of blue bricks. The 1881 census shows that the mines and brickworks were major employers. Because the coal and clay beneath the eastern side of Aldridge (towards Stonnall) is located much deeper under the surface, extraction of this coal and clay would not have been economically viable. As a result, farms continued to dominate the eastern part, though a sand quarry was set up and still remains on Birch Lane.

During the 20th century, modern shops were built in the centre of Aldridge, as well as council buildings. During the Second World War, a small airport called Aldridge Airport was used during the for military personnel and was then used for passenger services for a time.

Aldridge became an urban district in Staffordshire in 1894. Other villages within the district included Pelsall, Walsall Wood, Clayhanger and Streetly. These areas began to grow substantially with private house building from the 1930s, mostly bought by families relocating from the central areas of Walsall.

The urban district of Aldridge merged with Brownhills in 1966 to form Aldridge-Brownhills, and then became part of an expanded Metropolitan Borough of Walsall in 1974.

Demography
There were 39,463 usual residents as at Census day 2011. Of these, 99.7% lived in households and 0.3% lived in communal establishments. The average (mean) age of residents was 43.4 years.
In total there were 17,317 household spaces. Of these, 16,922 (97.7%) had at least one usual resident and 395 (2.3%) had no usual residents..

Politics 
The Aldridge-Brownhills constituency is a safe seat for the Conservative Party. , the current Member of Parliament (MP) is Wendy Morton, who was first elected at the 2015 general election. Her predecessor Sir Richard Shepherd had held the seat since 1979.

Aldridge is made up of two council wards: Aldridge Central & South, Aldridge North & Walsall Wood. There are three Conservative Councillors for Aldridge Central & South: Pard Kaur, Bobby Bains & Tim Wilson.
Aldridge North & Walsall Wood is also covered by three Conservative councillors: Keith Sears, Anthony Harris and Gary Clarke.

Education 
Aldridge has a number of primary and secondary schools. The primary schools are Cooper and Jordan (CE), Leighswood, St Mary of the Angels (Catholic) and Whetstone Field (Redhouse primary school was closed in the summer of 2006.). The secondary schools are Aldridge School and St Francis of Assisi Catholic College.

Industry and commerce
In Aldridge there are a number of factories with several large industrial estates in the area. Some of the most notable factories include the large Ibstock and weinberger brick works,  and the GKN Driveshafts factory, although the latter company closed in recent years due to relocation and cheaper foreign imports. Birlec, a manufacturer of industrial furnaces relocated to Aldridge in the late 1950s, but has since closed. Aldridge Plastics Ltd, a plastics injection moulder, was set up in the town in 1968 and continued trading for almost 40 years before ceasing production in 2007. From January 2011, GFP Engineering Ltd, a Glass Reinforced Plastic (GRP) moulding company, will commence trading after relocating from nearby Lichfield. There is also a marina, Aldridge Marina, which recently underwent full refurbishment offering facilities for canal boat moorers.

Most of the town's shops are located either on High Street, Anchor Road, or in the shopping area known as "The Parade". Well-known shops here include WH Smith, Iceland supermarket, Home Bargains, and Boots The Chemist. A purpose-built Safeway (UK) opened in 1992 and started operating as a Morrisons from 2004. B & M took over the former Focus DIY in Coppice Lane and opened its doors for the first time on 1 August 2015. One of the oldest traders in Aldridge is R.H.N. Riley Insurances on Anchor Rd, they have been trading since 1957 and in Aldridge since about 1970. Also in the area is the relatively newly opened Wetherspoons Public House - it has refurbished the former Avion cinema, latterly a bingo hall before the transition to pub. Many of the original features have been retained including the protected facade.

Transport 

Aldridge is served by local bus services. Many of the buses in Aldridge were renumbered in April 2010 as part of National Express West Midlands' attempt to simplify bus services in and around the Walsall area. Bus operators operating services through Aldridge are
Diamond West Midlands, Select Bus and National Express West Midlands. Services operated are to Walsall, Birmingham, Sutton Coldfield, Brownhills and Lichfield.

Aldridge railway station was on the Sutton Park Line running from Walsall to Birmingham via Sutton Coldfield. It also had a direct link to Wolverhampton on the now defunct Wolverhampton and Walsall Railway as well as a direct link to Brownhills via Walsall Wood although this closed in 1960s. The station had services to Walsall, Birmingham, Wolverhampton and Brownhills that operated services for passengers. The station was closed in 1966 and since then the line has been used only for freight. Ongoing speculation about returning passenger services to Aldridge, which would require a new station to be built, has continued with the apparent inclusion of Aldridge and Streetly stations on a map in the 2016 West Midlands Strategic Transport Plan.  In February 2021, the West Midlands Combined Authority announced that the land needed for the station to be rebuilt had been acquired for £400,000.

Sports, recreation and entertainment 
Aldridge has a cricket and hockey club called "The Stick and Wicket", located on the green behind the parish church, St. Mary's, and the Masonic Hall. Aldridge Hockey Club merged with Walsall Hockey Club in 2011; it is now known as Aldridge & Walsall Hockey Club.

Aldridge Sailing Club was formed in 1967 and celebrated its 50th anniversary in 2017. It is an RYA affiliated club and offers regular training courses. It is located on Barns Lane and Stubbers Green Road. www.aldridgesc.org.uk

Aldridge Rugby Football Club was formed in 1998 from an amalgamation of two established rugby clubs based in Birmingham: Witton and Old Centrals.  The club is based on the former Old Centrals sports ground at Bourne Vale in Aldridge and currently plays in Midlands 5 West (North), fielding three senior sides.

Aldridge Compass Suites (based at the Masonic Hall on the Green) is a venue for wedding receptions, christenings and other functions.

The Aldridge Youth Theatre was officially opened by the actor Bernard Hepton and is located on Noddy Park Road. It is run by a group of volunteers and puts on a variety of plays throughout the year. A pantomime is usually staged in January.

Air Cadets: 425 (Aldridge) Squadron, part of Staffordshire Wing of the Air Training Corps was formed in 1941 and currently occupies a purpose-built HQ close to the village centre. The Squadron is run by uniformed RAFVR(T) officers and ATC SNCO adult staff, assisted by civilian instructors and a padre.

The 36th Walsall 1st Aldridge scout group is located on Middlemore Lane, opposite Anchor Meadow, and runs Beaver, Cub, Scout and Explorer sections for boys aged 6 and upwards. The beavers are aged 6–8, cubs are aged 8–10/11, scouts are aged 11–14 and explorers are aged 14–18.

The Methodist church is used by 1st Aldridge Girl guides as well as two brownie groups and a rainbow group. The rainbows group is for girls aged 5–7, the brownies for girls aged 7–10, and guides aged 10–14. Older girls also take part and are known as the senior section.

St. Mary's Parish Church has one of the largest church youth groups in the area. Around 90 young people, between the ages of 13 and 18, attend the group. The group also hosts an annual summer camp in Wales (in recent years attracting over 100 teenagers), as well as a weekend away in February.

The 33rd Walsall Scout group is based at Aldridge Methodist Church and holds Beavers, Cubs and scouts for boys and girls aged 6–14. They go on annual scout camps and have been to Beaudesert Campsite and Blackwell Adventure.

The 49th Walsall Scout Group is the third Scout Group in Aldridge based at St Thomas's Church at the bottom of St Thomas Close, on the estate just off Lazy Hill Road and Greenwood Road.  It also caters for boys and girls between the ages of 6 and 18.

Suburbs
Suburbs and villages of the town include: Castlefort (Part), Walsall Wood (Part), Leighswood.

Notable residents

Military
Air Chief Marshal Sir Stuart William Peach, GBE, KCB, ADC, DL was educated at Aldridge Grammar School.

Military honours 
Charles George Bonner VC, DSC (29 December 1884 – 7 February 1951), born in Aldridge, was an English recipient of the Victoria Cross, the highest and most prestigious award for gallantry in the face of the enemy that can be awarded to British and Commonwealth forces. Bonner Grove is a well-maintained neighbourhood of social housing flats and privately owned houses in Aldridge that remembers his name.

Literature 
Deborah Beale lived in Aldridge and attended Leighswood School, then Aldridge School. Together with her Husband Tad Williams wrote the best selling novels The Dragons of Ordinary Farm and The Secrets of Ordinary Farm.

Glynis M Parkes born in Aldridge and attended Cooper & Jordan School, then Aldridge Grammar School.   Has written and published 5 novels.  The first END OF MAY 1923 is a true story set in Aldridge / Brownhills and Pelsall, during and just after WW1 1914  - 1923, a family story that was buried in secrecy for 100 years.  A love story with an emotional and life changing ending.  Four other novels - set on the Isle of Wight between 1960 and 1985.  Each book a different story, all CRIME/THRILLERS but linked together by a passionate and dramatic love story thread throughout. Find them all on Amazon/Kindle BOOK 1 - CHALE HATH NO FURY.  BOOK 2 - WIGHT DIAMONDS & CRAZY RED DOGS.  BOOK 3 - THERE WAS A CROOKED MAN.  BOOK 4 - FINAL ECHOES - A WHISPER INTO THE WIND.

Sports men and women 
Charles Holland was a road bicycle racer, and one of the first two Britons to ride the Tour de France. Rode in Olympic Games: Los Angeles 1932 and Berlin 1936.

Vic Milne had a doctor's surgery in Portland Road,  Aldridge.  Played football for Aston Villa, including an appearance in the 1924 FA Cup Final where his team were defeated 2-0 by Newcastle United.

Tom Davies (GeoWizard), a YouTuber and the first man to cross Norway in a straight line. He attended Aldridge School.

Lee Sinnott (born 12 July 1965 in Aldridge) is an English ex-professional footballer and was the manager of Farsley Celtic, whom he led to promotion three times in four years. He went on to manage Port Vale for a short period. He began his career at Walsall as an apprentice, and played in the 1984 FA Cup final for his next club Watford in 1984. He captained Huddersfield Town to Division Two playoff glory in 1995.

Colin Charvis, former captain of the Wales national rugby union team, went to the Redhouse School in Aldridge.

Swimmer Ellie Simmonds won two gold medals at both the 2008 and 2012 Paralympics. She attended Cooper and Jordan Primary School, then Aldridge School.

References

External links
 Walsall council local history
 Even more local history
 
 

 
Towns in the West Midlands (county)
Former civil parishes in the West Midlands (county)
Walsall